The Philippine Football Federation National Men's Club Championship was an annual football competition organized by the Philippine Football Federation and contested by Filipino clubs. It lasted for four seasons from 2011 to 2014–15. It was sponsored by mobile phone and Internet service provider Smart Communications and was therefore known as the PFF–Smart National Men's Club Championship.

History
The Philippine Football Federation (PFF) had not been able to organize a national tournament since 2007, when they staged the PFF Centennial Men's Open Championship. However, the semi-final finish of the Philippine national team in the 2010 AFF Championship increased the sport's popularity in the country. In January 2011, Smart Communications approached the PFF with an offer to finance a new domestic football competition. The proposed partnership was set to last 10 years, with Smart releasing ₱80 million in funds with the aim of providing more playing opportunities for skilled football players, and the eventual creation of a national league.

Newly installed Philippine Football Federation president Mariano V. Araneta subsequently approved the proposal. In March 2011, the new tournament commenced under the name PFF–Smart Men's Club Championship.

Seasons
2011
2012–13
2013–14
2014–15

Cup winners and runners-up

List of finals

Results by club

Notes

A.  Global won the first leg 3–0, and San Beda won the second meeting 2–0.

B.  Ceres won the first leg 2–1 and the second leg 1–0.

References

External links
Philippines - List of Champions, RSSSF.com

Defunct football competitions in the Philippines
Recurring sporting events established in 2011
National association football cups
Recurring sporting events disestablished in 2015
2011 establishments in the Philippines
2015 disestablishments in the Philippines